Calothrix crustacea is a species of cyanobacteria that is widespread in oceans worldwide.

Anatomy
Unusually for bacteria, the filaments of this species have an elongated base and a pointed tip with transparent hair at the end. The filaments have coatings that are either firm or jelly-like, and they all are made up of concentric layers that are colored yellow or brown. The filament also grows like the root of a plant. Sometimes the filament sheds and can reproduce asexually by dropping fragments (hormogonia) off the stem.

Habitats
This species of cyanobacteria frequently coat coastal rocks and seaweeds. This species may also form the photosynthetic part of certain rocky shore lichens, such as Lichina pygmaea.

References

Rivulariaceae
Bacteria described in 1886